Reddick Nunatak is a nunatak in the east part of the Phillips Mountains, 8 nautical miles (15 km) east-northeast of Mount Carbone, in the Ford Ranges of Marie Byrd Land. Mapped by United States Antarctic Service (USAS) (1939–41) and by United States Geological Survey (USGS) from surveys and U.S. Navy air photos (1959–65). Named by Advisory Committee on Antarctic Names (US-ACAN) for Warren W. Reddick, Jr., construction electrician, U.S. Navy, at Byrd Station in 1967.

References
 

Nunataks of Marie Byrd Land